Javier D. Ferrer Fernández (born December 29, 1961) is a Cuban-American lawyer, financial advisor, businessman and politician who served as President and member of the board of the Puerto Rico Government Development Bank for Governor Alejandro García Padilla. 

He graduated from Harvard University with a Bachelor of Arts degree in 1983 and from Boston College Law School with a Juris Doctor in 1986. After graduating from law school he practiced law with Kutak, Rock & Campbell from 1986 to 1988. From 1988 to 1989 he practiced law with O'Neill & Borges LLC. From 1989 to 1991 he practiced law with Hernandez Mayoral & Ferrer. From 1991 to 1992 he practiced law with McConnell Valdes LLC.

Ferrer is a founding partner of Pietrantoni Méndez & Álvarez LLC which specializes in commercial law, corporate law, corporate finance law, public finance law, commercial lending, and mergers and acquisitions. He practiced law with the firm from 1992 to 2014. He has also served as an advisor to financial institutions. Mr. Ferrer has been distinguished by Chambers as one of the world's best corporate lawyers. 

In December 2012, he was appointed head of the Government Development Bank, that serves as government financial advisers.

Since October 1, 2014, he has been acting as Executive Vice President, Chief Legal Officer and Corporate Secretary of Popular, Inc. Mr. Ferrer is a director of Banco Popular de Puerto Rico.

He is married to Blanca Pujals Escudero and they have 5 children.

References

1961 births
Living people
Members of the 16th Cabinet of Puerto Rico
Presidents of the Puerto Rico Government Development Bank
Harvard University alumni
Boston College Law School alumni
20th-century American lawyers
21st-century American lawyers
21st-century American businesspeople
Popular Democratic Party (Puerto Rico) politicians
American financial businesspeople
People from Havana